Leon Petrażycki (Polish: Leon Petrażycki; Russian: Лев Иосифович Петражицкий [Lev Iosifovich Petrazhitsky]; born 13 April 1867, in Kołłątajewo, Mogilev Governorate, now in Belarus – 15 May 1931, in Warsaw) was a Polish philosopher, legal scholar, and sociologist.  He is considered an important forerunner of the sociology of law.

Life 
Leon Petrażycki was born into the Polish gentry of the Mogilev Governorate in the Russian Empire. In 1890 he graduated from Kiev University, then spent two years on a scholarship in Berlin, and in 1896 received a doctorate from the University of St. Petersburg. At the latter university, he served from 1897 to 1917 as a professor of the philosophy of law.

In 1906 Petrażycki was elected to the ill-fated First Duma as a member of the Constitutional Democratic Party. When the legislature was dissolved after a few months, he was convicted and incarcerated for his protests. He was appointed to the Supreme Court of Russia in 1917, but had to flee the country when the Bolshevik revolution succeeded. He found a new home in Poland and became the first professor of sociology at Warsaw University in 1919.

A prolific writer in several languages and famous lecturer with a large following of students, Petrażycki committed suicide in 1931. However, Petrażycki's contribution to legal sociology and legal theory continues to be debated within various fields of legal research and applied to the study of current legal questions.

Work 
Petrażycki published many books in Russian, German, and Polish early in life. Unfortunately, many of his late ideas were preserved only in lecture notes taken by his students. Even in Poland, his work is only partly known.

English speakers still largely rely on a compilation of Petrażycki's writings edited by the Russian-American sociologist Nicholas S. Timasheff in 1955. Despite some recent efforts to introduce and revive his work, it is still largely unknown in the West.

Petrażycki conceives of law as an empirical, psychological phenomenon that can best be studied by introspection. According to him, law takes the form of legal experiences (emotions, impulsions) implying a two-sided relationship between a right on the one hand and a duty on the other hand. If this legal experience refers to normative facts in a broad sense (statutes, court decisions, but also contracts, customs, commands of any sort) he calls it "positive law"; if it lacks such reference, he talks of "intuitive law".

In another conceptualization, he contrasts "official law" (made by the state and its agents) to "unofficial law" (made by societal agents), which brings him close to legal pluralism. He parallels Eugen Ehrlich´s idea of living law when he states that "the true practice of civil law or any law is not to be found in the courts, but altogether elsewhere. Its practitioners are not judges and advocates, but each individual citizen..." (Petrażycki 1897, as quoted by Motyka)

Petrażycki's theory of law is anti-statist and very critical of the legal positivism of his time, which he takes to task for being naive and lacking a truly scientific basis because of its focus on norms, rather than the experience of those norms. He also rejects the rather common notion that only human beings can have rights and can therefore be seen as an early proponent of animal rights.

Petrażycki has been called the "unrecognized father of the sociology of law" (Adam Podgorecki 1980/81). His influence on the sociology of law has been primarily indirect through some of his students, specifically Nicholas S. Timasheff, Georges Gurvitch, and Pitirim Sorokin, who each in various ways contributed to formulate a more distinctly sociological perspective, derived from and complementary to Petrażycki's psychological theory.

See also
 History of philosophy in Poland
 International Institute for the Sociology of Law
 List of Poles
 Sociology in Poland
 Sociology of law
 Michał Weinzieher

Notes

References 
 Banakar, Reza, Who Needs the Classics? - On the Relevance of Classical Legal Sociology for the Study of Current Social and Legal Problems (September 3, 2012). RETSSOCIOLOGI, Ole Hammerslev, Mikael Rask Madsen, eds., Copenhagen: Hans Reitzels Forlag, 2012. Available at SSRN: http://ssrn.com/abstract=2140775.
 Roger Cotterrell, Leon Petrazycki and Contemporary Socio-Legal Studies (2015) 11 International Journal of Law in Context 1-16. Available at SSRN: https://papers.ssrn.com/sol3/papers.cfm?abstract_id=2609155.
 Krzysztof Motyka, Law and Sociology: The Petrażyckian Perspective. In: Michael Freeman (ed.) Law and Sociology. Current Legal Issues 2005. Oxford: Oxford University Press 2006, pp. 119–140.
 Adam Podgórecki, Unrecognized Father of Sociology of Law: Leon Petrażycki. Reflections based on Jan Gorecki's "Sociology and Jurisprudence of Leon Petrażycki". In: Law & Society Review, vol. 15 (1980/81), pp. 183–202.
 Jan Gorecki (ed.) Sociology and Jurisprudence of Leon Petrażycki. Urbana: University of Illinois Press 1975. https://link.springer.com/chapter/10.1007%2F978-94-007-1479-3_46
 Leon Petrażycki, Law and Morality. Edited with an introduction by N.S. Timasheff. Cambridge, Massachusetts: Harvard University Press 1955. Reprinted with a new introduction by A. Javier Trevino. New Brunswick: NJ: Transaction Publishers, 2011.
 Andrzej Kojder, Leon Petrażycki's Socio-legal Ideas and their Contemporary Continuation, 6 Journal of Classical Sociology 2006, pp. 333–358
Edoardo Fittipaldi, Bonae fidei possessor fructus consumptos suos facit. Tentative Answers to One Question Left Open by Petrażycki's Economic Analysis of Law. Societas/Communitas, 7, 2009, 1, pp. 15–36
 Edoardo Fittipaldi, Psicologia giuridica e realismo: Leon Petrażycki. Milan: LED 2012. 
 Edoardo Fittipaldi, Everyday Legal Ontology: A Linguistic and Psychological Investigation within the Framework of Leon Petrażycki's Theory of Law. Milan: LED 2012. , http://www.lededizioni.com/lededizioniallegati/600-Fittipaldi-Everyday-Ontology.pdf
 Мережко А.А. Психологическая школа права Л.И. Петражицкого. Истоки, содержание, влияние. – Одесса: «Фенікс», 2016.

External links
 Onati International Institute for the Sociology of Law

1867 births
1931 suicides
People from Syanno District
People from Sennensky Uyezd
19th-century Polish nobility
Russian Constitutional Democratic Party members
Members of the 1st State Duma of the Russian Empire
Polish sociologists
Philosophers of law
Polish jurists
Polish feminists
Russian judges
Russian legal scholars
Male feminists
Sociologists of law
20th-century Russian philosophers
20th-century Polish philosophers
19th-century Polish philosophers
Academic staff of the University of Warsaw
Academic staff of Saint Petersburg State University
Recipients of the Order of Saint Stanislaus (Russian), 2nd class
Recipients of the Order of St. Anna, 2nd class
20th-century Polish nobility